Dr. Sylvia-Yvonne Kaufmann (born 23 January 1955) is a German politician who served as a Member of the European Parliament (MEP) from 1999 to 2009, and from 2014 to 2019. She is a member of the Social Democratic Party, part of the Party of European Socialists.

Kaufmann is a qualified Japanologist. She was Deputy Chairman of the PDS 1993–2000 and sat in the Volkskammer of the German Democratic Republic before reunification and the Bundestag thereafter.

From 20 July 2004 to January 2007 Kaufmann served as one of the 14 Vice-Presidents of the European Parliament.

On 14 May 2009 she left the Left Party after she failed to be reselected for the list of candidates for the European elections and joined the Social Democrats.

Kaufmann is member of the executive board of Europa-Union Deutschland, the German section of the Union of European Federalists.

References

External links

 Kaufmann at the site of the European Parliament

1955 births
Living people
German Japanologists
Socialist Unity Party of Germany politicians
Members of the 10th Volkskammer
Politicians from Berlin
The Left (Germany) MEPs
Social Democratic Party of Germany MEPs
Recipients of the Cross of the Order of Merit of the Federal Republic of Germany
MEPs for Germany 1999–2004
MEPs for Germany 2004–2009
MEPs for Germany 2014–2019
20th-century women MEPs for Germany
21st-century women MEPs for Germany
Female members of the Volkskammer
Women orientalists